The NRW Trophy (also known as the NRW Summer Trophy or NRW Autumn Trophy) is an annual international figure skating competition organized by the Skating Union of North Rhine-Westphalia and since 2007, it has been sanctioned by the Deutsche Eislauf Union and the International Skating Union. It is held every autumn at Westfalenhallen in Dortmund, Germany. Medals are awarded in the disciplines of men's singles, women's singles, pair skating, and ice dance. The competition is held in two parts. The Ice Dance Trophy is held for ice dance levels pre-novice to senior in early November. The Figure Skating Trophy is held for singles and pairs skating levels novice to senior in late November or early December.

Senior medalists

Men

Women

Pairs

Ice dance

Junior medalists

Men

Women

Pairs

Ice dance

Advanced novice medalists

Men

Women

Pairs

Ice dance

References

External links
 Official site
 Official Youtube channel

 
Figure skating competitions
International figure skating competitions hosted by Germany
Sport in Dortmund